Babra Sharif, (born 10 December 1954) is a Pakistani film actress, most known for her roles from the mid-1970s to the 1980s. She started her career in television commercials. She has worked with many famous names of her time, including Shahid, Nadeem, Waheed Murad, Ghulam Mohyedin, Faisal Rehman, Muhammad Ali and even Sultan Rahi. She had great success in Urdu films in Pakistan. She did a variety of roles which proved her versatility as an actress. Some critics have also considered her as one of the best actresses of her time in Pakistan.

She has worked in more than 100 movies.

Early life
Sharif was born in Lahore, Pakistan in a middle-class family  from her early childhood, she took considerable interest in show business.

Career

Modelling and television
Sharif began modelling at the age of 12; she made her presence felt in a 'Jet' washing powder commercial in 1973 and came to be known as 'Jet' powder girl. Fair-haired, attractive and intelligent, she soon became a household name. In the same year, she appeared in Mohsin Shirazi's television play, which was telecast from a Karachi television station and also in the PTV drama Kiran Kahani, a classical slapstick comedy written by Haseena Moin and directed by Shirin Khan which had Roohi Bano, Manzoor Qureshi, Jamshed Ansari in the cast. After a long while, she came back to television in 1992 and gave a performance in Nadan Nadia, a Pakistan television comedy play by Anwar Maqsood.

Her appearance in the 'Lux' advertisement with the message, 'Aakhir loag hamara chehra he to deikhtay hain',(Urdu meaning: People look at our face(s) only) took her fame to the top.

Films

1970s
In 1974, Shamim Ara signed Sharif for her film Bhool which was scheduled to be directed by S. Sulaiman. At the same time, S. Sulaiman also signed Sharif for his film Intezaar. Both films released in 1974 but incidentally, Intizaar was released before Bhool. Hence, Sharif debuted in the film Intezaar as a supporting character. Her another release of 1974 Shama directed by Nazar Shabab and co-starring Waheed Murad, Deeba, Mohammad Ali and Nadeem, was a golden jubilee.

Despite her work in films, Sharif had to look for more opportunities in movies, which did not came immediately. In 1975, she appeared as supporting actress, in director Masood Pervez's film Mera naa patay khan. Neelo and Shahid played the lead roles. Her efforts took on a new intensity and she proved her worth in the Pakistani cinema. She worked in director Iqbal Kashmiri's film Shareef  Budmaash. Ali Sufyan Aafaqi's film Ajnabi, Nazar Shabab's film Naukar.

An undeterred Sharif, dressed to perform, played the lead role opposite Ghulam Mohyedin, in director Wazeer Ali's film Masoom. Her most memorable role came in the super hit 1975 film Mera Naam Hai Mohabbat, directed by Shabab Kiranvi and earned her Special Award from Nigar Awards. Her next  five releases in 1976, Pervez Malik's film Talaash, Shabab Kiranvi's film Dewar, Ali Sufyan Aafaqi's film Aag aur Aansoo, Aslam Daar's film Zubeida and one of her most successful films Shabana, directed by Zafar Shabab. The film successfully completed golden jubilee, by winning performances turned in by Sharif, Waheed Murad and Shahid. Sharif also won Best Actress award from Nigar Awards.

Sharif continued her success with Zafar Shabab's Waqt in which she  co-starred with Waheed Murad, Kavita and Shamim Ara. Next year in 1977 she played the title character in film Aashi.

1980s
In 1980, she appeared in Iqbal Akhtar's film Chotay Nawab. She again collaborated with Akhtar in 1981 film Dil nay phir yaad kya with Shahid and Waheed Murad. Her first release of 1982, was Sangdil; her performance was appreciated and she also won her second Best Actress award from Nigar Awards. From 1980 to 1990 Sharif worked in number of films. Some of them were successful, some were not but despite that her career remained successful in that decade. Some of her notable films of that decade are Deewanay Do, Chakkar, Khahish, Deikha jaaye ga, Jawani Deewani, Mausum hai Aashiqana, Aladin, Maa bani dulhan, Kaali, Insaan, Do Dil, Qudrat da intiqaam, Hero, Miss Colombo (1984) and Miss Bangkok (1986). For her performances in last two films, she won two Best Actress award by Nigar Awards respectively.

By the late 1980s, Sharif took more challenging roles and won critical praise for her performances in movies Aik Chehra Do Roop, Mehak, Saathi, Baaghi Haseena, Ishq Da Roag, Baarish, Duniya, Kundan (1987), Mukhra (1988) and Gori Deyaan Jhan Jharan (1990). For her performances in last three films, she won three Best Actress award by Nigar Awards respectively.  In 1989, Sharif also worked in Pakistan's first sci-fi film Shaani directed by Saeed Rizvi but the film was a commercial and critical failure.

1990s – Career setback, success regained and retirement
By the 1990s, Sharif's films failed to do well at box office. By the mid-1990s, she appeared only few films. During that time, she took a break and later started shooting for director Sangeeta's film Samaaj. She had to give up her character in Samaaj. But her next release in 1995 film Ham nahin ya tum nahin was a box-office success, which she followed with Piyasa Sawan and Dostana. In 1996 her film Sajawal released which was also a success. But after regaining success, Sharif did not sign more films. Sharif's last film was Ghayal, in which she worked opposite Izhar Qazi. Directed by Hasnain and released in 1997.   
Sharif said about her decision to quit acting that"I am self analytical. It is important to keep your feet on the ground in a profession where you are idolized to such an extent that each wish becomes a command for others. But I had always wanted to quit films at the peak of my career. I had prepared myself mentally for that moment. One of the reasons why I am at peace with myself is that I never socialized or made friends with the showbiz lot. Examples of actors like Waheed Murad made a deep impression on me. I never wanted to touch the peak of stardom only to drop low in life. No, life is more than lights, adulation and being beautiful,"

In 2005, she appeared in a Lux 50 years celebration commercial.

She temporarily resumed her career as a model and currently owns a jewellery shop in Karachi.

Awards and accolades
She received the Nigar Awards eight times in her movie career. 
 Special Award from Nigar Awards for her work in the film Mera Naam Hai Mohabbat in 1975.
 Nigar Award for best actress in the film Shabana in 1976. (Urdu)
 Nigar Award for best actress in the film Sangdil in 1982. (Urdu)
 Nigar Award for best actress in the film Miss Colombo in 1984. (Urdu)
 Nigar Award for best actress in the film Miss Bangkok in 1986. (Urdu)
 Nigar Award for best actress in the film Kundan in 1987. (Urdu)
 Nigar Award for best actress in the film Mukhra in 1988. (Punjabi)
 Nigar Award for best actress in the film Gori deyaan jhan jharan in 1990. (Punjabi)

In 2003, Sharif won LUX Icon of Beauty Award by Lux Style Awards held in Karachi.

Filmography

See also 
 List of Pakistani actresses

References

External links
 

1954 births
Living people
Pakistani film actresses
Pakistani television actresses
Nigar Award winners
Pakistani female models
Punjabi people
Actresses from Lahore
20th-century Pakistani actresses
21st-century Pakistani actresses
Recipients of Sitara-i-Imtiaz